"Animals" is a big room house instrumental by Dutch DJ and record producer Martin Garrix, released as a digital download on 17 June 2013 on iTunes. The song quickly became popular within the EDM culture, leading to Garrix becoming the youngest producer to ever have a song reach number one on the electronic music store Beatport. The track was a commercial success, reaching the top ten or topping on a number of electronic music charts and even some mainstream ones. It became number 1 on singles charts in the United Kingdom, French-speaking Switzerland and Belgium. In the United States it reached number 21 on the Billboard Hot 100 and number 1 on the Dance chart.

It is considered one of the most popular big room house songs of all-time, along with "Epic" by Sandro Silva and Quintino, "Spaceman" by Hardwell, "Tsunami" by Dvbbs and Borgeous and "Tremor" by Dimitri Vegas & Like Mike.

Composition and release
Prior to release, the track gained buzz after being played anonymously with speculation increasing about the author after Dutch record label Spinnin' Records released a clip of the track online only titled "Animals (Teaser)". It started to reach even more speculation after a Vine video featuring Agnes from Despicable Me was posted. The track was, at various times, attributed to other acts like Hardwell, GTA, Sidney Samson and Bassjackers before the actual identity of the producer was revealed.

According to Garrix, the melody was based on a previous, never-released track that he composed two years prior, and the "ruthlessly minimalist" rhythmic sound (the drop) is an interpretation of Busta Rhymes' "What It Is". and the first part is inspiring to a song by Aura Qualic called D.A.T.A. The song is mostly instrumental; the only sung verse to appear here is We're the fucking animals, which is spoken by a friend of Garrix, has a low pitch and appears two events.

Critical reception
In 2016, Billboard named "Animals" Garrix's second-best song, behind "In the Name of Love". The review noted how Garrix "ushered in a new dance era and crowned the then-17-year-old, leader of the new school", further describing the song as "big, brash and infectious, everything a festival anthem should be. It still sounds dope so many years later".

Commercial performance
Animals booked initial success at electronic music festivals and venues like Ultra Korea, Tomorrowland, Governors Beach Club, Amsterdam Dance Event, and Ultra Music Festival, to name a few. Subsequently, it rose to number one at the online music store, Beatport 100. In the period of August to October, the track began to climb up dance hit-lists as well as mainstream singles charts across continental Europe, getting all the way to top on Belgium's Ultratop 50. In November, the single debuted at number one on UK's Official Singles Chart, ahead of tough competition from Lily Allen's 2013 John Lewis Christmas advert cover single "Somewhere Only We Know" (which reached number one the following week) and Ellie Goulding's Children in Need 2013 cover "How Long Will I Love You?". Garrix became the second-youngest artist to enter at the top of the UK Singles Chart with their debut single behind Billie's "Because We Want To" in July 1998.

In the United States, "Animals" was the first instrumental track to reach the top 40 on the Billboard Hot 100 since Kenny G's "Millennium Mix" of "Auld Lang Syne" in 1999.

As of June 2020, the song's music video has over 1.5 billion views on YouTube.

Usage in media
"Animals" was used in a commercial for video game Madden NFL 25. It was added in the March 2014 update of another game, Asphalt 8: Airborne.  "Animals" was also featured on Just Dance 2016 along with an extreme routine. The instrumental version of the song was also featured in FIFA Online 3, an online free-to-play version of the FIFA series video game.

In April, the track was also used in the Dior advertisement for their "Addict Fluid Stick" lipstick and lipgloss range.

Track listing

Charts

Weekly charts

Year-end charts

Decade-end charts

Certifications

Release history

Parodies 
In December 2013, a SoundCloud user named McMaNGOS posted an edited version of "Animals" titled "Funnymals", which remixes the song's drop to the tune of "Old McDonald Had a Farm". The "Funnymals" edit gained prominence at the 2014 Ultra Music Festival, when Deadmau5 (who had made comments attacking Garrix on Twitter earlier in the day, and has been a prominent critic of "mainstream" electronic music) played the edit as part of his live set.

See also
 List of number-one dance singles of 2013 (U.S.)

References

2013 singles
Martin Garrix songs
Ultratop 50 Singles (Flanders) number-one singles
Ultratop 50 Singles (Wallonia) number-one singles
Number-one singles in Scotland
UK Singles Chart number-one singles
Electronic dance music songs
Spinnin' Records singles
2013 songs
Songs written by Martin Garrix